In convex analysis, the Fenchel–Moreau theorem (named after Werner Fenchel and Jean Jacques Moreau) or Fenchel biconjugation theorem (or just biconjugation theorem) is a theorem which gives necessary and sufficient conditions for a function to be equal to its biconjugate.  This is in contrast to the general property that for any function .  This can be seen as a generalization of the bipolar theorem.  It is used in duality theory to prove strong duality (via the perturbation function).

Statement
Let  be a Hausdorff locally convex space, for any extended real valued function  it follows that  if and only if one of the following is true
  is a proper, lower semi-continuous, and convex function,
 , or
 .

References

Convex analysis
Theorems in analysis
Theorems involving convexity